Judy Richardson is an American documentary filmmaker and civil rights activist. She was Distinguished Visiting Lecturer of Africana Studies at Brown University.

Early life
Richardson was born in Tarrytown, New York. She attended Washington Irving Jr. High. Richardson entered Swarthmore College in Pennsylvania in 1962 on a full scholarship.

Activism
During Richardson's freshman year at Swarthmore in 1962–1963, she joined the Swarthmore Political Action Committee (SPAC), a Students for a Democratic Society (SDS) affiliate. She graduated from Swarthmore in 1966.

Richardson was an early participant with the Student Nonviolent Coordinating Committee (SNCC) from 1963 to 1966. During her time with SNCC, Ella Baker was her mentor. In 1963, Richardson traveled on weekends, with other Swarthmore SPAC volunteers, to assist the Cambridge, Maryland community in desegregating public accommodations. The Cambridge Movement was led by Gloria Richardson with assistance from SNCC field secretaries, including Baltimore native Reggie Robinson. In 1963, Richardson joined a SNCC organized sit-in at a Toddle House in Atlanta. Richardson eventually joined the SNCC staff at the national office in Atlanta, where she worked closely with James Forman, Ruby Doris Smith-Robinson, and Julian Bond.

Richardson relocated to Mississippi during 1964 Freedom Summer after the SNCC national office moved there. She worked with SNCC during their effort that summer to register African American voters in Mississippi, joining Amzie Moore, Bob Moses, Curtis Hayes, and Hollis Watkins. Richardson also worked in SNCC's projects in Lowndes County, Alabama (with Stokely Carmichael/Kwame Ture and others) and in Southwest Georgia. Richardson became Julian Bond's office manager in 1965, during his successful first campaign for the Georgia House of Representatives. She also organized a northern Freedom School, bringing together young activists from SNCC's northern and southern projects.

Drum and Spear Bookstore
In 1968, shortly after the assassination of Martin Luther King Jr., Richardson and other former SNCC staffers founded Drum and Spear Bookstore in Washington, D.C. It became the largest Black bookstore in the country, with Richardson as the children's editor of Drum and Spear Press. Richardson said about the bookstore's name that the drum symbolized "communications within the diaspora" while the spear suggested "whatever else might be necessary for the liberation of the people."

In 1970, Howard University's Journal of Negro Education published Richardson's essay on racism in Black children's books.

Later years
Richardson attended Columbia University and received her degree from Antioch College in General Studies. In 2012, Richardson received an honorary degree from Swarthmore and spoke at the 2012 commencement ceremony.

In 2019, Richardson was the keynote speaker for National History Day. In September 2020 she was featured on the USA Today Storytellers Project Live.

Richardson serves on the board of directors of the SNCC Legacy Project, which preserves records of Black activism past and present.

Films and publications

Starting in the late 1970s, Richardson became an early researcher, series associate producer, and content advisor for the series Eyes on the Prize, which Henry Hampton executive produced through his company Blackside. Eyes on the Prize was a 14-hour documentary series on the history of the American civil rights movement, broadcast on PBS in 1987 and 1990. The series was nominated for an Academy Award for Best Documentary Feature in 1988. Richardson later co-produced Blackside's 1994 Emmy and Peabody Award-winning documentary, Malcolm X: Make It Plain (for PBS's The American Experience).

Serving as a senior producer for Northern Light Productions in Boston, Richardson produced historical documentaries for broadcast and museums, with a focus on African American historical events, including: a one-hour documentary called Scarred Justice: Orangeburg Massacre 1968 (South Carolina) for PBS; two History Channel documentaries on slavery and slave resistance; and installations for, among others, the National Park Service's Little Rock Nine Visitor's Center, the National Underground Railroad Freedom Center, the New York State Historical Society's "Slavery in New York" exhibit, and the Paul Laurence Dunbar House.

Richardson co-edited Hands on the Freedom Plow: Personal Accounts By Women in SNCC published by University of Illinois Press. The book won the NAACP Image Award for Outstanding Literary Work, Nonfiction in 2011.

References

External links
 Judy Richardson Personal Papers, 1979-2010 at Washington University Libraries.
 Hands on the Freedom Plow: Personal Accounts By Women in SNCC published by University of Illinois Press.
 Zinn Education Project profile of Judy Richardson
 SNCC Digital Gateway: Judy Richardson, Documentary website created by the SNCC Legacy Project and Duke University, telling the story of the Student Nonviolent Coordinating Committee & grassroots organizing from the inside-out.
 Judy Richardson interview for Swarthmore Libraries Student Activism: Civil Rights, 1960 – 1966 oral history project, December 6, 2017.
 Since 1968: The Drum & Spear Bookstore  Library of Congress documentary, September 24, 2018.
 Beyond MLK: Teaching The Civil Rights Movement On January 21, 2019, Judy Richardson was among those interviewed by Kojo Nnamdi on WAMU about teaching and studying the civil rights movement.
 Judy Richardson shares a personal story for "Uprisings: Stories of the work of civil rights" Judy Richardson tells the story of when she was 20-years-old and escaped from a white mob in 1964 Freedom Summer, among other stories of her experiences in SNCC. On USA Today Storytellers Live Project, September 24, 2020.

Living people
Year of birth missing (living people)
People from Tarrytown, New York
Swarthmore College alumni
American democracy activists
Civil rights movement
Student Nonviolent Coordinating Committee
Activists for African-American civil rights
Brown University faculty
American documentary filmmakers